The Incheon Free Economic Zone (IFEZ), located in Incheon, South Korea is a Korean Free Economic Zone that consists of the three regions of Songdo, Cheongna, and the island of Yeongjong and has a total area of . The goal of the IFEZ is to transform these three areas into hubs for logistics, international business, leisure, and tourism for the Northeast Asian region. Incheon's Free Economic Zone was officially designated by the Korean government in August 2003.  IFEZ is planned to be a self-contained living and business district featuring air and sea transportation, a logistics complex, an international business center, financial services, residences, schools and hospitals, and shopping and entertainment centres.

Purpose
The Incheon Free Economic Zone (IFEZ) was established with the intent of its becoming one of the future top three economic zones in the world.  The time period for the Infrastructure Development stage was from 2003 to 2009, and the time period for the Project Development stage was from 2010 to 2014.  The final stage is expected to be completed by 2020. The first stage is for building infrastructures, and the second stage is for "expanding the infrastructure for education, health, and leisure, and attracting domestic and international businesses"  The final stage is to realize the goal of the project of building a top three economic zone in the world.

Investment incentives
In order to attract many domestic and international businesses, three types of incentives are given: tax reductions, estate support, and subsidies. No taxes are levied on corporate and individual income for few years.  The regional government does not impose the acquisition tax over 15 years and the property tax over 10 years.  After 10 years of operation without any property tax levied, the business entities are imposed only 50% of the property taxes for three years. The period of corporate and individual income tax levied by the national government varies by the size and the types of the business moving into the district.

New Songdo City
Songdo International City began development in 1994 and is being built on reclaimed land. It is designated to become a center of businesses, a hub for international trade, an area for knowledge-based technologies, and a place for living.

In August 2009, Incheon hosted the Global Fair & Festival 2009 Incheon, Korea in the New Songdo City for a period of 80 days.
 Development size: 
 Planned population: 252,000 persons
 Construction duration: 1994~2015
 a  new city on 
 The 68-story Northeast Asia Trade Tower, which will stand as Korea's tallest building.
 The Songdo Convensia, operating as Incheon's primary convention center, is Korea's largest column-free interior space.
  of open space including a  Central Park.
 The Incheon Arts Center, a cultural complex housing a concert hall, opera house, museum of Asian contemporary art, a music conservatory, design school, artist in residence housing, and a library.
 Public and private schools including the International School Songdo (ISS) for students kindergarten through high school.

International Business District 

The projected budget is approximately 22 billion dollars. The developer is NSIC, a joint venture company between GALE and POSCO.

Songdo Convencia was under construction since March 2005 and was completed by early 2009. It is Songdo's first LEED certified project.  NEATT has been under construction since February 2007, and the first phase will be finished by the end of 2009. It will contain 65 stories to a height of approximately 300 meters. A central park is also under construction that will be 10% the size of Songdo International City. It will contain a museum, a botanical garden, an artificial lake and was scheduled to open in June 2009.

Incheon Tower 

Incheon Tower will be located in Construction Area 11. It is proposed 151-floor, 610 meter tower but the Incheon government cancelled the plan due to financial problems.

Incheon Bridge 

Construction was completed in 2009

Incheon International Hospital 

Incheon will have a hospital in its new Songdo City complex in 2014.

According to the MOU, the hospital with 600 beds will be the first profit-making medical institute in Korea, with a sizable foreign investment. It is estimated to cost 400 billion won. 

The hospital will be built on an 80,000 square-meter site, and construction will be completed by late 2016.

Yeongjong Island 
Yeongjong International City’s  centering on the Incheon International Airport will be developed as an eco-friendly airport city by 2020. It will be a functional city with residential amenities for airport staff and visitors, as well as logistics, commercial and distribution facilities. Yeongjong will provide an optimal environment for logistic, tourism and leisure in conjunction with the Incheon International Airport.
 Development size: 
 Planned population: 144,800 persons
 Duration: 2002~2016

Cheongna 
The Cheongna district, on the mainland adjacent Yeongjong Island, will focus on entertainment and will feature a world class theme park.  It will also be a residential area with sports facilities, a floriculture complex, and a business area specially designed for international finance. 

 Development Size: 
 Planned population: 90,000 persons
 Duration: 2004~2008

References

Geography of Incheon
Korean Free Economic Zones